The Association against Bulgarian Bandits was a paramilitary organization based in Štip, then in the Kingdom of Serbs, Croats and Slovenes.

Background 

During World War I the Serbian Army and Chetnik movement were in conflict with the Bulgarian Internal Macedonian Revolutionary Organization (IMRO) and Army, which occupied most of Serbia and Macedonia. Bands of Chetniks organized the Toplica uprising, which was quickly crushed by the Bulgarian soldiers and IMRO chetas. The post-war Treaty of Neuilly denied Bulgaria what it felt was its share of Macedonia and Pomoravlje. As result the state fell in a heavy situation having lost territory to Serbia, Greece and Romania with reparations to those countries. In the new formed Kingdom of Serbs, Croats and Slovenes, the Chetnik movement ceased functioning as a guerrilla force. However, the IMRO began soon sending armed bands from Bulgaria into Serbian part of Macedonia to assassinate officials and stir up the spirit of the Bulgarian part of the local population. Also in 1921 IMRO created as a satellite organisation the Internal Western Outland Revolutionary Organisation (IWORO), which operated in the areas of Tsaribrod and Bosilegrad, ceded to Yugoslavia. In 1922 a new organization called Association against Bulgarian Bandits was launched by a former Chetniks to withstand the IMRO and the IWORO militants in the areas of Vardar Macedonia and the Western Outlands with Kosta Pećanac as leading figure in it. In 1923 and 1924 during the apogee of interwar military activity according to IMRO statistics in the region of Yugoslav (Vardar) Macedonia operated 53 armed bands. The aggregate membership of the bands was 3245 rebels, 119 fights and 73 terroristic acts were documented. At the same time IWORO carried out numerous assaults on the Tzaribrod–Belgrade railway, especially on the bridges. Violent Serb counter-measures tended merely to cement the support to IMRO.

On the other hand, the reestablished in 1920 IMRO had its own left wing and it split over the ultimate goal of its activity. The right faction sought incorporation of all Macedonian territory into Bulgaria, while the left faction sought separate Macedonia that could join future Balkan Federation. In December 1921, left-leaning deserters of IMRO formed the official Macedonian Federative Organization. Violence between the two groups reinforced a political crisis growing public impression that Bulgarian government was unstable. Meanwhile, the government started military campaign against the IMRO in the Summer of 1921 using the Federative Organization as ally. The Premier Aleksandar Stamboliyski proclaimed as his aim the forming a new Balkan Federation of agrarian states. In March 1923 he signed the Treaty of Niš with the Kingdom of Serbs, Croats and Slovenes and undertook the obligation to suppress the operations of the IMRO and IWORO carried out from Bulgarian territory. As result in the Summer of 1923, IMRO aided by radical officers organized coup d'état in Bulgaria. The fall of the pro-Yugoslav government of Aleksandar Stamboliyski was a great success to the power of IMRO. Subsequently, part of the fleeing from Bulgaria federalists placed themselves in Serbian service, joining the Association against Bulgarian Bandits and fighting against IMRO. Serbian Prime Minister Ljubomir Davidović openly disagreed with such policy but Žika Lazić, head of the team that mobilized such guerillas, responded he did not find a better mechanism for mutual annihilation between current and former Bulgarian Komitadjis.

Aftermath 
 

As a consequence, aided unofficially by the new government, the IMRO acted as a "state within a state" in Bulgaria, which was used as its hub for swift attacks against Yugoslavia. Because of this, at the end of the 1920s the Yugoslav-Bulgarian frontier was turned into the most fortified one in Europe. The Serbian actions led to a significant reduction of the IMRO attacks. IMRO's constant fratricidal killings and assassinations abroad provoked some within Bulgarian military after the coup of 19 May 1934 to take control and break the power of the organization, which had come to be seen as a gangster organization inside Bulgaria and a band of assassins outside it. Afterwards the Association against Bulgarian Bandits was gradually dissolved.

References

Auxiliary military units
Counterterrorist organizations
Organizations established in 1923
Paramilitary organizations based in Serbia
1923 establishments in Yugoslavia